The Sultan Ismail–Kampung Pandan Link is a major highway in Kuala Lumpur city, Malaysia. This highway is maintained by the Kuala Lumpur City Hall or Dewan Bandaraya Kuala Lumpur (DBKL).

History
The Sultan Ismail–Kampung Pandan Link which connecting from Imbi junctions of Jalan Sultan Ismail and Jalan Imbi to Jalan Kampung Pandan interchange near Kampung Maluri. Construction began on 2006 and was completed on the mid 2008. The projects led by Malaysian Public Works Department (JKR) and DBKL.

List of interchanges 

Highways in Malaysia
Expressways and highways in the Klang Valley
Roads in Kuala Lumpur